Amri, Iran may refer to:

Amreh, Sari
Ameri, Deylam

See also
Amri (disambiguation)
Ameri (disambiguation)